Manuel Germán Cuello was a Colombian politician, Mayor of Valledupar in 1967 and Governor of the Department of Cesar by appointment under the presidency of Misael Pastrana between June 19, 1971 and August 13, 1974. Cuello was member of the Colombian Conservative Party.

Governor of Department of Cesar (1971–1974)

Cabinet
Secretary of Government: Efrain Quintero Araujo
Secretary of Development: Cerveleon Padilla
Secretary of Finances: Parmenides Salazar
Secretary of Education: Jaime Araujo Noguera
Chief of Planning: Francisco Ramos Pereira
Chief of Judicial Bureau: Jorge Enrique Restrepo
Private Secretary: Marcos J. Orozco

References

Mayors of places in Colombia
People from Valledupar
Governors of Cesar Department
Colombian Conservative Party politicians
Living people
Year of birth missing (living people)